Ellery Cairo (born 3 August 1978) is a Dutch former professional footballer who played as a winger.

Club career
Cairo played his first seasons of senior football for Feyenoord, Excelsior, Twente, SC Freiburg and Hertha BSC, before moving to English club Coventry City on 30 June 2007 on a free transfer from Hertha BSC. After only one season manager Chris Coleman announced that Cairo's contract was not to be renewed and he was subsequently released. 

Several clubs were interested in signing Cairo, but it was NAC Breda who ended up with his services after friendly match against amateur club DOSKO. After he passed the medical, he signed a two-year contract, making NAC the seventh club in his career. After two seasons at the club, in which he made almost fifty appearances, often as a substitute, his expiring contract was no longer extended. As a free agent, Cairo signed with Heracles Almelo in September 2010. In 2011 he signed with AGOVV Apeldoorn. After one season, he left for amateur club DETO Twenterand. He suffered a knee injury in his first match for DETO and afterwards decided to retire.

International career
Cairo received a call-up for the Netherlands national team for a friendly against Italy in 2005, after Ruud van Nistelrooy pulled out because of injury. However, Cairo never played a minute for Oranje.

Managerial career
In summer 2014, Cairo was appointed assistant coach at the FC Twente women's team. He announced his departure in 2017. He has since worked as a fitness coach for Twente and as a personal trainer for players such as Kevin-Prince Boateng.

Honours
Feyenoord
 Eredivisie: 1998–99
 KNVB Cup: 1994–95
 Johan Cruyff Shield: 1999

Twente
 KNVB Cup: 2000–01

References

External links
Ellery Cairo player profile at ccfc.co.uk

1978 births
Living people
Footballers from Rotterdam
Dutch footballers
Dutch sportspeople of Surinamese descent
Association football forwards
Netherlands under-21 international footballers
VV Spijkenisse players
Feyenoord players
Excelsior Rotterdam players
FC Twente players
SC Freiburg players
Hertha BSC players
Coventry City F.C. players
NAC Breda players
Heracles Almelo players
AGOVV Apeldoorn players
DETO Twenterand players
Eredivisie players
Eerste Divisie players
Bundesliga players
English Football League players
Dutch expatriate footballers
Expatriate footballers in Germany
Expatriate footballers in England
Dutch expatriate sportspeople in Germany
Dutch expatriate sportspeople in England